The James A. FitzPatrick (JAF) Nuclear Power Plant is located in the Town of Scriba, near Oswego, New York, on the southeast shore of Lake Ontario.  The nuclear power plant has one General Electric boiling water reactor.  The  site is also the location of two other units at the Nine Mile Point Nuclear Generating Station.

The power plant was originally built by Niagara Mohawk Power Corporation.  FitzPatrick and half of the Nine Mile Point site were transferred to the Power Authority of the State of New York (PASNY), now called the New York Power Authority (NYPA). It was named after Power Authority Chairman James A. FitzPatrick.  On November 2, 2015, Entergy Corp. announced its plans to shut down FitzPatrick Nuclear Power Plant in Oswego County after the reactor runs out of fuel in 2016. To avoid closure, Exelon Generation agreed to purchase the plant from Entergy at the price of $110 million.

On April 1, 2017, Exelon assumed ownership and operation of the plant. Following separation from Exelon in 2022, Constellation Energy assumed ownership and operation.

Surrounding population

The 2010 U.S. population within  of FitzPatrick was 35,136, an increase of 17.0 percent in a decade, according to an analysis of U.S. Census data for msnbc.com. The 2010 U.S. population within  was 909,798, an increase of 3.2 percent since 2000. Cities within 50 miles include Syracuse (36 miles to city center). Canadian population is not included in these figures, such as Kingston, Ontario, 49 miles to the city center.

Seismic risk
The Nuclear Regulatory Commission's estimate of the risk each year of an earthquake intense enough to cause core damage to the reactor at FitzPatrick was 1 in 163,934, according to an NRC study published in August 2010.

Announced closure
On November 2, 2015, Entergy Corporation announced that it intends to close the James A. FitzPatrick Nuclear Power Plant because it is becoming too costly to operate. The nuclear industry's profits have been squeezed out by utilities who are buying cheaper energy from natural gas power plants. “Given the financial challenges our merchant power plants face from sustained wholesale power price declines and other unfavorable market conditions, we have been assessing each asset,” Chief Executive Officer Leo Denault said in the statement. “Market conditions require us to also close the FitzPatrick nuclear plant.”

In 2016, Cuomo directed the Public Service Commission to consider ratepayer-financed subsidies similar to those for renewable sources to keep nuclear power stations profitable in the competition against natural gas.

In August 2016, Exelon agreed to buy the plant pending regulatory approval.

Exelon formally acquired ownership and operation of James A. Fitzpatrick Nuclear Power Plant on March 31, 2017.

See also

 Darlington Nuclear Generating Station — located on the opposite side of Lake Ontario
 List of nuclear reactors
 New York energy law
 Nuclear power
 Nuclear power plant
 Pickering Nuclear Generating Station — located on the opposite side of Lake Ontario

Notes

Further reading

Energy infrastructure completed in 1975
Nuclear power plants in New York (state)
Buildings and structures in Oswego County, New York
Exelon